The 2019–20 EFL Cup was the 60th season of the EFL Cup. Also known as the Carabao Cup for sponsorship reasons, the competition was open to all clubs participating in the Premier League and the English Football League.

Manchester City were the two-time defending champions, having retained the trophy in 2019, and won their third consecutive title, defeating Aston Villa in the final at Wembley Stadium in London on 1 March 2020.

Access
All 92 clubs in the Premier League and English Football League entered the season's EFL Cup. Access was distributed across the top 4 leagues of the English football league system. For the first two rounds, the draw was regionalised into northern and southern clubs.

In the first round, 22 of 24 Championship clubs and all League One, and League Two clubs entered. Due to their financial crisis, Bury were later withdrawn from the competition and ultimately expelled from the EFL. Sheffield Wednesday, who were Bury's first round opponents, advanced to the second round automatically as a result.

The following round, the two remaining Championship clubs Cardiff City and Fulham (who finished 18th and 19th respectively in the 2018–19 Premier League season), and the Premier League clubs not involved in either the Champions League or Europa League entered.

Arsenal, Chelsea, Liverpool, Manchester City, Manchester United, Tottenham Hotspur, and Wolverhampton Wanderers all received byes to the third round owing to their participation in European competitions.

First round
A total of 70 clubs played in the first round: 24 from League Two (tier 4), 24 from League One (tier 3), and 22 from the Championship (tier 2). The draw for this round was split on a geographical basis into 'northern' and 'southern' sections. Teams were drawn against a team from the same section. The draw was made by John Barnes and Ray Parlour on 20 June 2019.

Northern section

Southern section

Second round
A total of 50 teams played in the second round, including Fulham and Cardiff City from the Championship, as well as the Premier League clubs that are not involved in European competition. The draw for this round was split on a geographical basis into 'northern' and 'southern' sections. Teams were drawn against a team from the same section. The draw was made on 13 August 2019 by Gary Neville and Paul Robinson.

Northern section

Southern section

Third round
A total of 32 teams played in this round. Arsenal, Chelsea, Liverpool, Manchester City, Manchester United, Tottenham Hotspur, and Wolverhampton Wanderers entered in this round due to their European qualification. The draw was conducted on 28 August 2019 by Andy Hinchcliffe and Don Goodman. The ties were played on the week commencing 23 September 2019.

Fourth round
A total of 16 teams played in this round (none of which were Championship sides). The draw was conducted at Stadium MK by Andy Hinchcliffe and Don Goodman following the third round match between MK Dons and Liverpool on 25 September 2019.	
Ties were played in the week commencing 28 October 2019.

Quarter-finals
A total of eight teams played in this round. The draw was made on 31 October 2019, by David James and Zoe Ball on BBC Radio 2's Breakfast Show. Ties were played in the week commencing 16 December 2019. Liverpool fielded an inexperienced side for their fixture against Aston Villa and were managed by the under-23s boss, Neil Critchley, while the first team participated in the 2019 FIFA Club World Cup in Qatar under Jürgen Klopp.

Semi-finals
A total of four teams played in this round. The draw was made on 18 December 2019, by Dennis Wise and Chris Kamara at Oxford United's Kassam Stadium. First leg ties were played in the week commencing 6 January 2020, while the second legs were played in the week commencing 27 January 2020.

Manchester City won 3–2 on aggregate.

Aston Villa won 3–2 on aggregate.

Final

The final was played at Wembley Stadium on 1 March 2020.

Top goalscorers

References

EFL Cup seasons
EFL Cup
EFL Cup
Cup